Blackhall may refer to:

Places
 Two adjoining villages in County Durham, England:
Blackhall Colliery
Blackhall Rocks
Blackhall, Edinburgh, Scotland
 Blackhall Road, Oxford, England
 Blackhall townland, near Clane, County Kildare, Ireland
 Blackhall, a neighbourhood of Paisley, Renfrewshire, Scotland

People
 Barony of Blackhall, Scottish feudal barony which originally covered the area of Renfrewshire and a part of Ayrshire
 David Scott Blackhall (1910–1981), English radio personality, author, and poet
 Gilbert Blackhall (died 1671), Scottish Catholic missionary priest
 Mark Blackhall (born 1960), English former footballer
 Sheena Blackhall (born 1947), Scottish writer, illustrator, and singer

Other
 Blackhall Gaels GAA, a Gaelic Athletic Association club in Ireland

See also
 Blackhall Manor, house near Paisley in Renfrewshire, Scotland
 Black Hall, listed building in Devon, England